The Comics Grid: Journal of Comics Scholarship is a peer-reviewed open access academic journal covering comics studies. The journal also publishes scholarly articles in comics form.

History
The project was originally conceived between 2009 and 2010 by comics scholars Roberto Bartual, Esther Claudio, Ernesto Priego, Greice Schneider, and Tony Venezia as a peer-reviewed comics studies blog. It became an open access peer-reviewed journal in 2013, published by Ubiquity Press. Since 2015 the journal is published by the Open Library of Humanities.

Abstracting and indexing
The journal is abstracted and indexed by the Modern Language Association Database, Scopus, and the Emerging Sources Citation Index.

Side publications
The Comics Grid. Journal of Comics Scholarship. Year One is an open access 292-page ebook compilation of the journal's first volume of peer-reviewed short articles which were originally published on the Comics Grid WordPress platform between January 2011 and January 2012.

Webinar Series
The Comics Grid Webinar Series are online panels where two authors talk about their articles published recently in the journal. The webinars are live and the recordings are made available via YouTube.

Reception 
The journal is included in the listing of journals at ComicsResearch.org and New York University Libraries' guide for students and researchers interested in comics and graphic novels.

A 2013 Working Paper from the Creativity, Regulation, Enterprise and Technology Research Centre University of Glasgow, titled "Writing About Comics and Copyright", focuses on the journal as a case study.

In 2017, the journal was nominated for a Digital Humanities Award in the Public Engagement category.

In 2018, two editors of the journal received an Open Scholarship Award 2018 Honorable Mention for their work advancing open access in comics studies.

Further reading
Smith, J. 19 March 2018. "The Comics Grid: Open access challenges and opportunities". Open Insights. Retrieved 13 August 2021.

References

External links

Arts journals
Publications established in 2011
Continuous journals
Creative Commons Attribution-licensed journals
English-language journals